Watford Football Club are an association football team from the county of Hertfordshire, England. The 1914–15 season was their nineteenth season of league football, since joining the Southern League as West Hertfordshire for the 1896–97 season. Watford finished the season as champions of the Southern League First Division, winning 22 and drawing 8 of their 38 league matches. In other competitions, Watford were eliminated from the FA Cup in the sixth qualifying round by Rochdale, and from the Southern Charity Cup by fellow Southern League team Luton Town. The club's manager was Harry Kent, and its top scorer George Edmonds, with 17 goals from 35 appearances. Other notable players included Skilly Williams, who began what would be a 13-year period as the club's first choice goalkeeper, and Fred Gregory, whose goal against Gillingham sealed the title for Watford. Gregory and Williams were also the only two men to play in all 40 of Watford's games.

As a result of the suspension of league football due to the First World War, Watford were the reigning champions for the next five years, until they were beaten to the 1919–20 title on goal average by Portsmouth.

Background

Although he had managed Watford since the departure of John Goodall in 1910, Harry Kent made two final competitive appearances in December 1913, before retiring completely as a player. Watford lost both matches, and off the pitch Kent had an equally difficult season. Watford finished in 18th position in the Southern League First Division, and only managed to avoid relegation on the final day of the season with a 2–0 win over QPR. Despite a 10–0 thrashing of Bournemouth in their opening FA Cup match, they were defeated by Gillingham in the following round. Furthermore, financial difficulties forced Kent to offload several key players at the end of the season. Top scorer Thomas Ashbridge and full back Harry Pantling were sold to Sheffield United for £500 each, while first choice goalkeeper Joe Webster transferred to West Ham United for £300. Other former first team regulars to leave the club before the start of 1914–15 included David Donald, Billy Dryden and Tommy Mitchell.

Southern League

Despite Britain's declaration of war in August 1914, the Southern League continued as normal for the 1914–15 season. Watford started their campaign on 2 September with a 2–1 win against Cardiff F.C. They continued their strong start to the season with a run of 6 wins and 3 defeats from the opening 9 fixtures, including a 3–0 home win against 1913–14 champions Swindon Town. However, the following two fixtures yielded consecutive league defeats to Reading and Southampton, and Watford's remaining 8 games of 1914 provided only two further wins.

The new year brought a dramatic change in fortunes for Watford's season. Watford won 10 and drew 2 of their first 12 games of 1915, with George Edmonds, Peter Ronald and injured Charlie White's replacement Arthur Green all scoring freely. A win and a defeat against Luton Town, a 2–0 defeat to West Ham United and a heavy 6–0 loss at Swindon enabled Reading and Cardiff to close in on Watford's points tally and goal average. But Watford secured the title in their penultimate match, with Fred Gregory scoring the decisive goal in a 3–2 win at Gillingham.

Results
Legend

Final standings

Two points were awarded for a win, one point for draws, and none for defeats. Due to the war, no clubs were relegated at the end of the season, although Croydon Common ceased trading before the start of the 1919–20 season.

Players

Statistics
Key

P: Games played

G: Goals scored

References

General

Specific

External links
Watford Football Club official site

Watford
Watford F.C. seasons